Katja Flint (born 11 November 1959 in Stadthagen, Lower Saxony) is a German actress. She has appeared in over 100 film and television productions since 1982. Among her more notable roles is Marlene Dietrich in the film biopic Marlene (2000).

Born in Germany, Flint grew up in Utah and was married to German actor Heiner Lauterbach between 1985 and 2001, although they already separated in 1991. They have a son named Oscar who was born in 1988. She was in long-term relationships with Bernd Eichinger, a German film-producer, in the 1990s and Peter Handke, an Austrian author, in the early 2000s.

Filmography 
 Piratensender Powerplay (1982)
  (1984)
 Forget Mozart (1985)
 Leo und Charlotte (1991, TV miniseries)
 The Democratic Terrorist (1992)
  (1994)
  (1996, TV film)
 A Girl Called Rosemary (1996, TV film)
 Widows – Erst die Ehe, dann das Vergnügen (1998)
  (1999, TV film)
 Straight Shooter (1999), as Regina Toelle
 Marlene (2000)
 Vera Brühne (2001, TV film)
  (2002, TV film)
 Olgas Sommer (2003)
 Love and Desire (2003, TV film)
 Pfarrer Braun: Der Fluch der Pröpstin (2004, TV series episode)
  (2005, TV film)
 The White Masai (2005)
 Beyond the Balance (2006)
 Why Men Don't Listen and Women Can't Read Maps (2007)
  (2009, TV film)

External links 

 
 Photographs of Katja Fint

1959 births
Living people
People from Stadthagen
German film actresses
German television actresses
20th-century German actresses
21st-century German actresses